František Zajíček (15 November 1912 in Radňovice – 19 January 1987) was a Czechoslovak bobsledder who competed in the late 1940s. At the 1948 Winter Olympics in St. Moritz, he finished 14th in the four-man event. His brother is Jaroslav Zajíček.

References
 1948 bobsleigh four-man results
 Bobsledding four-man results: 1948–64
 
  Biography of František Zajíček 

Olympic bobsledders of Czechoslovakia
Bobsledders at the 1948 Winter Olympics
Czechoslovak male bobsledders
1912 births
1987 deaths
People from Žďár nad Sázavou District
Sportspeople from the Vysočina Region